The Democratic Republic of the Congo competed at the 2016 Summer Olympics in Rio de Janeiro, Brazil, from 5 to 21 August 2016. This was the nation's tenth appearance at the Summer Olympics since its debut in 1968, although it had previously competed in four editions under the name Zaire.

Four athletes from the Democratic Republic of the Congo, two per gender, were selected to the team across three different sports (athletics, judo, and taekwondo – the nation's sporting debut in Rio Janeiro) at the Games. Taekwondo fighter Rosa Keleku, the only qualified sportswoman in the team, served as the nation's flag bearer in the opening ceremony. The Democratic Republic of Congo, however, has yet to win its first Olympic medal.

Athletics (track and field)
 
Congolese athletes have so far achieved qualifying standards in the following athletics events (up to a maximum of 3 athletes in each event):

Track & road events

Judo
 
The Democratic Republic of the Congo has qualified one judoka for the men's half-lightweight category (66 kg) at the Games. Rodrick Kuku has received a spare continental quota spot freed up by South Africa from the African region as the nation's top-ranked judoka outside of direct qualifying position in the IJF World Ranking List of May 30, 2016.

Taekwondo
 
Democratic Republic of the Congo entered one athlete into the taekwondo competition for the first time at the Olympics. Rosa Keleku secured a spot in the women's flyweight category (49 kg) by virtue of her top two finish at the 2016 African Qualification Tournament in Agadir, Morocco.

References

External links 
 
 

Nations at the 2016 Summer Olympics
2016
Olympics